Collegiate Academy of Colorado is a small charter school located in the Ken Caryl area of unincorporated Jefferson County, Colorado, United States. It is a kindergarten through twelfth grade charter school with approximately 480 students (2009–10 enrollment). The school has a postal address of 8420 S. Sangre de Cristo Road, Littleton, Colorado, 80127. It opened in 1994.

The school has its own athletic field which it rents out for other uses. It has a gym, a cafeteria, and a playground. Its mascot is a wolf, and the school colors are crimson and dark green.

References

Charter schools in Colorado
Educational institutions in the United States with year of establishment missing
Public elementary schools in Colorado
Public high schools in Colorado
Public middle schools in Colorado